The 28th CARIFTA Games was held in Fort-de-France, Martinique, on April 3–5, 1999.

Participation (unofficial)

Detailed result lists can be found on the "World Junior Athletics History" website.  An unofficial count yields the number of about 376 athletes (197 junior (under-20) and 179 youth (under-17)) from about 21 countries:  Antigua and Barbuda (12), Aruba (4), Bahamas (34), Barbados (39), Bermuda (4), Cayman Islands (15), Dominica (5), French Guiana (4), Grenada (16), Guadeloupe (39), Guyana (3), Jamaica (58), Martinique (61), Netherlands Antilles (4), Saint Kitts and Nevis (7), Saint Lucia (2), Saint Vincent and the Grenadines (9), Suriname (2), Trinidad and Tobago (46), Turks and Caicos Islands (8), US Virgin Islands (4).

Austin Sealy Award

The Austin Sealy Trophy for the most outstanding athlete of the games was awarded to Darrel Brown from Trinidad and Tobago.  He won (at least) 2 gold medals (100m, and 200m) in the youth (U-17) category (there is no information on the composition of the relay teams).

Medal summary
Medal winners are published by category: Boys under 20 (Junior), Girls under 20 (Junior), Boys under 17 (Youth), and Girls under 17 (Youth).
Complete results can be found on the website of the Fédération française d'athlétisme,  and on the "World Junior Athletics History"
website.

Boys under 20 (Junior)

Girls under 20 (Junior)

Boys under 17 (Youth)

Girls under 17 (Youth)

Medal table (unofficial)

References

External links
World Junior Athletics History

CARIFTA Games
International sports competitions hosted by Martinique
1999 in Martinique
CARIFTA
1999 in Caribbean sport
Athletics competitions in Martinique